Così is a play by Australian playwright Louis Nowra which was first performed in 1992 at the Belvoir St Theatre in Sydney, Australia. Set in a Melbourne mental hospital in 1971, Così is semi-autobiographical, and is the sequel to his previous semi-autobiographical play, Summer of the Aliens.

The play was adapted into the 1996 film Cosi.

Plot summary
Set several years after the events of Summer of the Aliens, Lewis is now in a strained relationship with a bossy woman named Lucy, and in a friendship with political extremist, Nick. Lewis is always desperate for work as he states "I need the money". The venue is a theatre that smells of "burnt wood and mould", the cast are patients with very diverse needs, and the play is Mozart's Così fan tutte. Through working with the patients, Lewis eventually discovers a new side of himself which allows him to become emotionally involved and to value love, while anti-Vietnam war protests erupt in the streets outside.

Characters 
The patients make up a wide spectrum including Roy, a manic-depressive with a passion for theatre; Cherry, who has a food obsession and is a Lewis-addicted romantic; Ruth, suffering from obsessive–compulsive disorder (OCD) and is shown as obsessed with counting and distinguishing between illusions and reality; Doug, a pyromaniac, who loves sexual innuendo; Julie, dependent on drugs in the outside world; Henry, an older, silent man, previously a lawyer; and Zac, a drugged-up pianist.

Other characters include Justin, a social worker at the mental institution; Lewis's girlfriend Lucy and his best mate Nick, whose strongly left-wing ideals Lewis has followed up until now without question. Meeting patients with views different from Lucy's and Nick's opens Lewis' eyes to other people and the world around him, teaching him to be more tolerant.

Productions

Così was performed at La Boite Theatre in February, 2003. The play debuted in Asia in 2009, performed in The Hong Kong Fringe Club and directed by Wendy Herbert. It received its UK premiere in 1999 at the New End Theatre in London, starring Isla Fisher in her only stage appearance to date. It was performed at the White Bear Theatre in Kennington, London, starring Australian actor Mark Little as the manic-depressive Roy and Matthew Burton as the young theatre director, Lewis; it was directed by Adam Spreadbury-Maher for a 4-week season in August 2008. In 2011, the play was performed at the King's Head Theatre in Islington, London, directed by Adam Spreadbury-Maher. In 2012, the play was performed at Urban Stages in New York City, directed by Jesse Michael Mothershed and produced by Australian Made Entertainment. In February 2014, the play was given a major Australian revival by La Boite Theatre Company directed by longtime Louis Nowra collaborator David Berthold. Melbourne based theatre company MTC revived it again in a production directed by Sarah Goodes in May 2019.

References

Plays by Louis Nowra
1992 plays
Australian plays adapted into films
Fiction set in 1971
Melbourne in fiction
Wolfgang Amadeus Mozart in fiction
Works based on Così fan tutte